A chemin de ronde (French, "round path"' or "patrol path"), also called an allure, alure or, more prosaically, a wall-walk, is a raised protected walkway behind a castle battlement.

In early fortifications, high castle walls were difficult to defend from the ground. The chemin de ronde was devised as a walkway allowing defenders to patrol the tops of ramparts, protected from the outside by the battlements or a parapet, placing them in an advantageous position for shooting or dropping.

References

External links 
 

Castle architecture